Ogcocephalus is an anglerfish genus in the batfish family Ogcocephalidae.

Species

There are currently 13 recognized species in this genus:
 Ogcocephalus corniger Bradbury, 1980 (Longnose batfish)
 Ogcocephalus cubifrons (J. Richardson, 1836) (Spotted batfish)
 Ogcocephalus darwini C. L. Hubbs, 1958 (Red-lipped batfish, Galápagos batfish)
 Ogcocephalus declivirostris Bradbury, 1980 (Slantbrow batfish)
 Ogcocephalus nasutus (G. Cuvier, 1829) (Shortnose batfish)
 Ogcocephalus notatus Valenciennes, 1837 (Oval batfish)
 Ogcocephalus pantostictus Bradbury, 1980 (Spotted batfish)
 Ogcocephalus parvus Longley & Hildebrand, 1940 (Roughback batfish)
 Ogcocephalus porrectus Garman, 1899 (Rosy-lipped batfish)
 Ogcocephalus pumilus Bradbury, 1980 (Dwarf batfish)
 Ogcocephalus radiatus Mitchill, 1818 (Polka-dot batfish)
 Ogcocephalus rostellum Bradbury, 1980 (Palefin batfish)
 Ogcocephalus vespertilio (Linnaeus, 1758) (Brazilian batfish, Seadevil)

See also
 List of prehistoric bony fish

References

Ogcocephalidae
Marine fish genera
Taxa named by Gotthelf Fischer von Waldheim